Women's double trap shooting made its first appearance at the 1996 Summer Olympics, with Kim Rhode becoming the inaugural champion. Susanne Kiermayer defeated Deserie Huddleston in the silver medal shoot-off.

Qualification round

OR Olympic record – Q Qualified for final

Final

OR Olympic record

References

Sources

Shooting at the 1996 Summer Olympics
Olymp
Shoo